Bhutto is a Sindhi clan found in Sindh, Pakistan. The Bhutto's along with Bhatti's and other subclans are said to be a branch of the Bhati Rajputs. They have been settled in Sindh for over two centuries, having migrated to the area from Jaisalmer in Rajasthan, India under Setho Khan Bhatti (Bhutto in Sindhi) in the seventeenth century. According to other authors, the family migrated to Sindh (mostly in Larkana and Sehwan) from Sarsa in Hissar. The Bhutto family of Pakistan hails from this clan.

References

Rajput clans of Sindh
Sindhi tribes
Sindhi-language surnames
Pakistani names
Bhutto family